John Edward Prine (October 10, 1946 – April 7, 2020) was an American singer-songwriter of country-folk music. He was active as a composer, recording artist, live performer, and occasional actor from the early 1970s until his death. He was known for an often humorous style of original music that has elements of protest and social commentary.

Born and raised in Maywood, Illinois, Prine learned to play the guitar at age 14. He attended classes at Chicago's Old Town School of Folk Music. After serving in West Germany with the U.S. Army, he returned to Chicago in the late 1960s, where he worked as a mailman, writing and singing songs first as a hobby and then as a club performer.

A member of Chicago's folk revival, a laudatory review by critic Roger Ebert built Prine's popularity. Singer-songwriter Kris Kristofferson heard Prine at Steve Goodman's insistence, and Kristofferson invited Prine to be his opening act, leading to Prine's eponymous debut album with Atlantic Records in 1971. The acclaim Prine earned from his first LP led to three more albums for Atlantic. He then recorded three albums with Asylum Records. In 1981, he co-founded Oh Boy Records, an independent label where he released most of his subsequent albums.

Widely cited as one of the most influential songwriters of his generation, Prine was known for humorous lyrics about love, life, and current events, as well as serious songs with social commentary and songs that recollect sometimes melancholy tales from his life. According to Nobel laureate songwriter Bob Dylan, "Prine's stuff is pure Proustian existentialism. Midwestern mindtrips to the nth degree. And he writes beautiful songs. . . . All that stuff about 'Sam Stone', the soldier junkie daddy, and 'Donald and Lydia', where people make love from ten miles away. Nobody but Prine could write like that." In 2020, Prine received the Grammy Lifetime Achievement Award.

Early life
Prine was the son of William Mason Prine, a tool-and-die maker, and Verna Valentine (Hamm), a homemaker, both originally from Muhlenberg County, Kentucky. He was born and raised in the Chicago suburb of Maywood. In summers, they would go back to visit family near Paradise, Kentucky. Prine started playing guitar at age 14, taught by his brother, David. He attended classes at Chicago's Old Town School of Folk Music, and graduated from Proviso East High School in Maywood, Illinois. He was a U.S. Postal Service mailman for five years and was drafted into the United States Army during the Vietnam War era, serving as a vehicle mechanic in West Germany before beginning his musical career in Chicago.

Chicago folk scene
In the late 1960s, while Prine was delivering mail, he began to sing his songs (often first written in his head on the mail route) at open-microphone evenings at the Fifth Peg on Armitage Avenue in Chicago.  The bar was a gathering spot for nearby Old Town School of Folk Music teachers and students. Prine was initially a spectator, reluctant to perform, but eventually did so in response to a "You think you can do better?" comment made to him by another performer. After his first open mic, he was offered paying gigs.  In 1970, Chicago Sun-Times movie critic Roger Ebert heard him by chance at the Fifth Peg and wrote the first review Prine ever received, calling him a great songwriter: After the review was published, Prine's popularity grew. He became a central figure in the Chicago folk revival, which also included such singer-songwriters as Steve Goodman, Michael Peter Smith, Bonnie Koloc, Jim Post, Tom Dundee, Anne Hills, and Fred Holstein. Joined by such established musicians as Jethro Burns and Bob Gibson, Prine performed frequently at a variety of Chicago clubs. He was offered a one-album deal of covers and with a few of his original songs, by Bob Koester from Delmark Records, but decided the project was not right for him.

In 1971, Prine was playing regularly at the Earl of Old Town. Steve Goodman, who was performing with Kris Kristofferson at another Chicago club, persuaded Kristofferson to go see Prine late one night. Kristofferson later recalled, "By the end of the first line we knew we were hearing something else. It must’ve been like stumbling onto Dylan when he first busted onto the Village scene."

Recording career

1970s 
Prine's self-titled debut album was released in 1971. Kristofferson (who once remarked that Prine wrote songs so good that "we'll have to break his thumbs") invited Prine and Goodman to open for him at The Bitter End in New York City. In the audience was Jerry Wexler, who signed Prine to Atlantic Records the next day. The album included Prine's signature songs "Illegal Smile" and  "Sam Stone", and songs that became folk and country standards, "Angel from Montgomery" and "Paradise." The album also featured "Hello in There", a song about aging that was later covered by numerous artists, and "Far From Me", a lonely waltz about lost love for a waitress, which Prine later said was his favorite of all his songs. The album received many positive reviews, and some hailed Prine as "the next Dylan". Bob Dylan himself appeared unannounced at one of Prine's first New York City club appearances, anonymously backing him on harmonica.

Prine's second album, Diamonds in the Rough (1972), was a surprise for many after the critical success of his first LP; it was an uncommercial, stripped-down affair that reflected Prine's fondness for bluegrass music and features songs reminiscent of Hank Williams. Highlights of the compilation include the allegorical "The Great Compromise", which includes a recitation and addresses the Vietnam War, and the ballad "Souvenirs", which Prine later recorded with Goodman.

His subsequent albums from the 1970s include Sweet Revenge (1973), containing such fan favorites as "Dear Abby", "Grandpa Was a Carpenter", and "Christmas in Prison", and Common Sense (1975), with "Come Back to Us Barbara Lewis Hare Krishna Beauregard". The latter album was Prine's first to chart on the U.S.
Top 100 by Billboard and reflected his growing commercial success. It was produced by Steve Cropper. Bruised Orange from 1978 is a Steve Goodman–produced album that gave listeners songs such as "That's The Way That The World Goes 'Round", "Sabu Visits the Twin Cities Alone", "Fish and Whistle", and the title track.

In 1974, singer David Allan Coe achieved considerable success on the country charts with "You Never Even Called Me by My Name", co-written by Prine and Goodman. The song good-naturedly spoofs stereotypical country music lyrics to create what it self-describes as "the perfect country and western song". Prine refused to take a songwriter's credit (stating he was too drunk when the song was written to remember what he had contributed) and Goodman received sole credit. Goodman bought Prine a jukebox as a gift from his publishing royalties.

In 1975, Prine toured the U.S. and Canada with a full band featuring guitarist Arlen Roth.

The 1979 album Pink Cadillac features two songs produced by Sun Records founder Sam Phillips, who by this time rarely did any studio work. The song "Saigon" is about a Vietnam veteran traumatized by the war ("The static in my attic's gettin' ready to blow"). During the recording, one of the guitar amplifiers blew up (which is evident on the album). The other song Phillips produced is "How Lucky", about Prine's hometown.

1980s 
In 1981, rejecting the established model of the recording industry, which Prine felt exploited singers and songwriters, he co-founded the independent record label Oh Boy Records in Nashville, Tennessee. His fans, supporting the project, sent him enough money to cover the costs, in advance, of his next album. Prine continued writing and recording albums throughout the 1980s. His songs continued to be covered by other artists; the country supergroup The Highwaymen recorded "The 20th Century Is Almost Over", which had been written by Prine and Goodman. Steve Goodman died of leukemia in 1984 and Prine contributed four tracks to A Tribute to Steve Goodman, including a cover version of Goodman's "My Old Man".

1990s 
In 1991, Prine released the Grammy Award-winning The Missing Years, his first collaboration with producer and Heartbreakers bassist Howie Epstein. The title song records Prine's humorous take on what Jesus did in the unrecorded years between his childhood and ministry. In 1995, Lost Dogs and Mixed Blessings was released, another collaboration with Epstein. On this album is the long track "Lake Marie", a partly spoken word song interweaving tales over decades centered on themes of "goodbye". Bob Dylan later cited it as perhaps his favorite Prine song. Prine followed it up in 1999 with In Spite of Ourselves, which was unusual for him in that it contained only one original song (the title track); the rest were covers of classic country songs. All of the tracks are duets with well-known female country vocalists, including Lucinda Williams, Emmylou Harris, Patty Loveless, Dolores Keane, Trisha Yearwood, and Iris DeMent.

2000s 
In 2001, Prine appeared in a supporting role in the Billy Bob Thornton movie Daddy & Them. "In Spite of Ourselves" is played during the end credits.

Prine recorded a version of Stephen Foster's "My Old Kentucky Home" in 2004 for the compilation album Beautiful Dreamer, which won the Grammy for Best Traditional Folk Album in 2004.

In 2005, Prine released his first all-new offering since Lost Dogs and Mixed Blessings, the album Fair & Square, which tended toward a more laid-back, acoustic approach. The album contains songs such as "Safety Joe", about a man who has never taken any risks in his life, and also "Some Humans Ain't Human", Prine's protest piece on the album, which talks about the ugly side of human nature and includes a quick shot at President George W. Bush. Fair & Square won the 2005 Grammy Award for Best Contemporary Folk Album. The album contains original songs plus two covers: A.P. Carter's "Bear Creek Blues" and Blaze Foley's "Clay Pigeons".

2010s 
On June 22, 2010, Oh Boy Records released a tribute album titled Broken Hearts & Dirty Windows: Songs of John Prine. The album features members of the modern folk revival including My Morning Jacket, The Avett Brothers, Conor Oberst and the Mystic Valley Band, Old Crow Medicine Show, Lambchop, Josh Ritter, Drive-By Truckers, Nickel Creek's Sara Watkins, Deer Tick featuring Liz Isenberg, Justin Townes Earle, Those Darlins, and Bon Iver's Justin Vernon.

In 2016, Prine was named winner of the PEN/Song Lyrics Award, given to two songwriters every other year by the PEN New England chapter. The 2016 award was shared with Tom Waits and his songwriting collaborator wife Kathleen Brennan. Judges for the award included Peter Wolf, Rosanne Cash, Paul Simon, Elvis Costello, and Bono, as well as literary judges Salman Rushdie, Natasha Tretheway, and Paul Muldoon. In 2016, Prine released For Better, or Worse, a follow-up to In Spite of Ourselves from 1999. The album features country music covers spotlighting some of the most prominent female voices in the genre, including; Alison Krauss, Kacey Musgraves, and Lee Ann Womack, as well as Iris DeMent, the only guest artist to appear on both compilation albums.

On March 15, 2017, the American Currents exhibit opened at the Country Music Hall of Fame. The exhibit featured a pair of cowboy boots and jacket that Prine often wore on stage, his personal guitar, and the original handwritten lyric to his hit, "Angel From Montgomery". The American Currents Class of 2016 showcased artists who made a significant impact on country music in 2016, including, Prine. Prine won his second Artist of the Year award at the 2017 Americana Music Honors & Awards after previously winning in 2005.

On February 8, 2018, Prine announced his first new album of original material in 13 years, titled The Tree of Forgiveness, would be released on April 13. Produced by Dave Cobb, the album was released on Prine's own Oh Boy Records and features guest artists Jason Isbell, Amanda Shires, Dan Auerbach, and Brandi Carlile. Alongside the announcement, Prine released the track "Summer's End". The album became Prine's highest-charting album on the Billboard 200.

In 2019, he recorded several tracks including "Please Let Me Go 'Round Again"—a song which warmly confronts the end of life—with longtime friend and compatriot Swamp Dogg in his final recording session.

Posthumous releases
The last song Prine recorded before he died was "I Remember Everything", released on June 12, 2020, alongside a music video. It was released following the two-hour special tribute show, A Tribute Celebrating John Prine aired on June 11, 2020, which featured Sturgill Simpson, Vince Gill, Jason Isbell, Kacey Musgraves, Bonnie Raitt, Rita Wilson, Eric Church, Brandi Carlile and many other country artists and friends. On the first night of the 2020 Democratic National Convention, Prine singing "I Remember Everything" was the soundtrack to the COVID-19 memorial video.

Personal life 
Prine was married three times. His first marriage was to high-school sweetheart Ann Carole in 1966. The marriage lasted until the late 1970s. Prine was married to bassist Rachel Peer from 1984 to 1988. Prine met Fiona Whelan, who later became his manager, in 1988. She moved from Ireland to Nashville in 1993, and they were married in 1996. Prine and Whelan had two sons together, Jack and Tommy, and Prine adopted Whelan's son, Jody, from a previous relationship. Prine had a home, and spent part of the year, in Kinvara, Galway, Ireland.

Health problems 
In early 1998, Prine was diagnosed with squamous-cell cancer on the right side of his neck. He had major surgery to remove a substantial amount of diseased tissue, followed by six weeks of radiation therapy. The surgery removed a piece of his neck and severed a few nerves in his tongue, while the radiation damaged some salivary glands. A year of recuperation and speech therapy were necessary before he could perform again. The operation altered his vocals and added a gravelly tone to his voice.

In 2013, Prine underwent surgery to remove cancer in his left lung. After the surgery, a physical therapist put him through an unusual workout to build stamina: Prine was required to run up and down his house stairs, grab his guitar while still out of breath, and sing two songs. Six months later, he was touring again.

Death 
On March 19, 2020, amid the COVID-19 pandemic in the United States, Prine's wife Fiona revealed that she had tested positive for SARS-CoV-2 and had been quarantined in their home apart from him. He was hospitalized on March 26 after experiencing COVID-19 symptoms. On March 30, Fiona tweeted that she had recovered and that John was in stable condition but not improving. Prine died on April 7, 2020, of complications caused by COVID-19 at the age of 73.

In accordance with Prine's wishes as expressed in his song "Paradise", half of his ashes were spread in Kentucky's Green River. The other half were buried next to his parents in Chicago.

Influence 
Prine is widely regarded as one of the most influential songwriters of his generation. He has been referred to as "the Mark Twain of songwriting".

Johnny Cash, in his autobiography Cash, wrote, "I don't listen to music much at the farm, unless I'm going into songwriting mode and looking for inspiration. Then I'll put on something by the writers I've admired and used for years—Rodney Crowell, John Prine, Guy Clark, and the late Steve Goodman are my Big Four ..."

Roger Waters, when asked by Word Magazine in 2008 if he heard Pink Floyd's influence in newer British bands such as Radiohead, replied, "I don't really listen to Radiohead. I listened to the albums and they just didn't move me in the way, say, John Prine does. His is just extraordinarily eloquent music—and he lives on that plane with Neil [Young] and [John] Lennon." He later named Prine as among the five most important songwriters.

Prine's influence is seen in the work of younger artists, whom he often mentored, including Jason Isbell, Amanda Shires, Brandi Carlile, Sturgill Simpson, Kacey Musgraves, Margo Price, Tyler Childers, and Robin Pecknold.

Awards and honors

Grammy Awards 
Prine won four Grammy Awards out of 13 nominations, as well as a Grammy Lifetime Achievement Award.

Other accolades
In 2005, at the request of U.S. Poet Laureate Ted Kooser, John Prine became the first singer-songwriter to read and perform at the Library of Congress.
In 2016, Prine received the PEN New England Song Lyrics of Literary Excellence Award.
In 2019, Prine was inducted into the Songwriters Hall of Fame with a speech by Bonnie Raitt.
Over his career, Prine received six awards from the Americana Music Honors & Awards: the Lifetime Achievement Award for Songwriting (2003), Artist of the Year (2005, 2017, 2018), Song of the Year for "Summer's End" (2019), and Album of the Year for The Tree of Forgiveness (2019).
On June 30, 2020, Illinois's Governor J.B. Pritzker posthumously named Prine the honorary Poet Laureate of Illinois.

Discography 
The week after his death, Prine hit number one on Billboards Rock Songwriters Chart because his singles ("In Spite Of Ourselves", "Angel from Montgomery", "Hello In There", "When I Get To Heaven", and "That's the Way the World Goes Round") all charted in the top 25 of the Hot Rock Song Chart.  On the Billboard 200, his 1971 debut album re-entered the chart at 55, and his last album, 2018's Tree of Forgiveness, re-entered at 109.

References

External links

 
 

  (Notes by John Prine about the inspirations for several of his songs)
 A Literary Evening with John Prine and Ted Kooser. March 9, 2005. The Poetry and Literature Center at the Library of Congress.

1946 births
2020 deaths
20th-century American guitarists
20th-century American male musicians
American folk singers
American male singer-songwriters
American country singer-songwriters
United States Army soldiers
American country guitarists
American bluegrass guitarists
American acoustic guitarists
American folk guitarists
Deaths from the COVID-19 pandemic in Tennessee
Folk musicians from Chicago
Grammy Award winners
Grammy Lifetime Achievement Award winners
Mail carriers
Old Town School of Folk musicians
People from Maywood, Illinois
Singer-songwriters from Illinois
Guitarists from Illinois
American male guitarists
Country musicians from Illinois